The 2012 North East Lincolnshire Council election took place on 3 May 2012 to elect members of North East Lincolnshire Council in England. This was on the same day as other 2012 United Kingdom local elections.

Council make up
After the 2012 local election, the  political make up of the council was as follows:

Labour won a majority of the seats on the authority for the first time since the 1999 local elections, making considerable gains from the Liberal Democrats who failed to win a single seat on the council at these elections. Labour gained a seat in Park ward - once seen as the safest Lib Dem ward on the council and only ever won by Lib Dem candidates since the creation of the authority. The Liberal Democrats were also reduced to just four seats - below their previous low point of just 5 seats after the 1999 local elections.

The Conservatives won no wards within the Great Grimsby constituency on the authority - only the second time this had happened in the authority's history, the first being the inaugural elections in 1995. UKIP also won their first seat on the authority in Scartho, a seat that was considered safe for the Conservatives, having won it at every local election since 1999.

UKIP also made considerable progress in many other wards which they would go on to win over the next few years, including Humberston & New Waltham, where at these elections, UKIP came little over 200 votes short of defeating Conservative councillor and Grimsby Town Football Club chairman John Fenty, a seat which UKIP would gain at a by-election in 2013 following the death of Fenty's fellow councillor, John Colebrook, and successfully held this seat when it was next up for election in 2014.

Ward results

Croft Baker

East Marsh

Note: Jon-Paul Howarth theoretically holds his seat, as he was elected as a Liberal Democrat when the seat was last fought in 2008, but quit the party to sit as an Independent, and went on to defect to the Labour Party mid-term.

Freshney

Note: Cliff Barber theoretically holds his seat, as he was elected as a Liberal Democrat when the seat was last fought in 2008, but defected to the Labour Party mid-term. Watkin is a former West Marsh councillor from 1999 to 2010.

Haverstoe

Heneage

Note: Ros James theoretically holds her seat, as she was elected as a Liberal Democrat when the seat was last fought in 2008, but defected to the Labour Party mid-term. Hocknell is a former councillor who represented the ward from 2003 to 2011.

Humberston & New Waltham

Immingham

 

Note: Swinburn is a former councillor who lost his seat the previous year after serving two terms as an Immingham councillor.

Park

 

Note: This was the first time that Park had been won by any party other than the Liberal Democrats and to date remains Labour's only victory in the ward in a local election since North East Lincolnshire Council's creation.

Scartho

Notes: This was the second occasion (the first being 1995 when Labour won all three seats) that the Conservatives failed to win a council seat in Scartho, and the first time UKIP won a seat on the authority. Dixon previously contested this ward as a Liberal Democrat in 2010 and 2011.

South

 

Note: Ernie Brown previously contested Great Grimsby in the 2010 general election and the Scartho ward in 2011 as an Independent.

Sidney Sussex

Yarborough

 

Note: Hyldon-King previously represented Freshney from 1995 to 2003, and again from 2004 to 2008. Bonner previously represented this ward from 2007 to 2011.

References

2012 English local elections
2012
2010s in Lincolnshire